Agar is a 2022 Pakistani television series directed by Ilyas Kashmiri and produced by Momina Duraid under banner MD Productions. It stars Hina Altaf, Junaid Khan, Juggan Kazim and Usama Khan in leading roles. The series was broadcast on 25 October 2022 on Hum TV in night prime-time slot.

Plot 

Annie, a school principal by profession and the sole breadwinner of her family, has not married due to her responsibilities being elder among her siblings. She notices Shahwaiz, the teacher in her school who takes interest in her actively. Annie's younger sister, Hooriya aspires to get a luxury lifestyle with her husband as she has seen her sister struggling her whole life. She starts dreaming these dreams with Farrukh when she encounters him, who is a young boy who falls for her and later sends proposal to her house. Annie's youngest sister, Chandi too aspires to become as successful as her eldest sister as at the time of her birth, her mother wants a boy.

Cast 
 Junaid Khan as Shahwaiz
 Juggan Kazim as Annie
 Hina Altaf as Hooriya
 Usama Khan as Farrukh
 Ali Abbas as Muthair
 Hina Khawaja Bayat as Annie's mother
 Maheen Siddiqui as Chandni
 Ismat Zaidi as Shahwaiz's mother
 Ahmed Randhawa as Behram
 Behroze Sabzwari as Shahwaiz's father
 Hira Soomro as Zainab
 Beena Masroor as Muthair's mother
 Saqib Sumeer 
 Fareeda Shabbir as Zainab's mother
 Salma Asim as Farrukh's mother

Production 

While giving detailed insight about her acting comeback, Kazim stated in conservation with DAWN Images that she is playing a school principal in the series opposite Khan's character. She also stated that Altaf is paired with Khan. The series marked the acting comeback of Kazim after almost eight years. The series is written by Madiha Shahid, while directed by Ilyas Kashmiri.

Reception

Critical reception 
While reviewing the first 4-5 episodes, a reviewer from the Youline Magazine, praised the performances of the cast and pace of the series, but criticized the casting of Junaid Khan as he is depicted as a younger guy, early to mid 20s.

References 

2022 Pakistani television series debuts